The 2016–17 Coastal Carolina Chanticleers women's basketball team represented Coastal Carolina University in the 2016–17 NCAA Division I women's basketball season. The Chanticleers, led by fourth year head coach Jaida Williams, played their home games at HTC Center and were first year members of the Sun Belt Conference. They finished the season 13–16, 8–10 in Sun Belt play to finish in a tie for seventh place. They lost in the first round of the Sun Belt women's tournament to Appalachian State.

Roster

Schedule

|-
!colspan=9 style=| Non-conference regular season

|-
!colspan=9 style=| Sun Belt regular season

|-
!colspan=9 style=| Sun Belt Women's Tournament

See also
2016–17 Coastal Carolina Chanticleers men's basketball team

References

Coastal Carolina
Coastal Carolina Chanticleers women's basketball seasons